NH 27 may refer to:

 National Highway 27 (India)
 New Hampshire Route 27, United States